Humor: International Journal of Humor Research is a peer-reviewed academic journal published by Walter de Gruyter on behalf of the International Society for Humor Studies. , its editor-in-chief is Christian F. Hempelmann (Texas A&M University-Commerce).

The journal publishes articles from a wide range of disciplines (e.g. psychology, literature, linguistics, sociology, theater, communication, philosophy, anthropology, computer science, history) as well as interdisciplinary articles related to humor research. The journal publishes mainly original research articles, but also theoretical papers, book reviews, scholarly debates, notes, and letters to editors. According to the Journal Citation Reports, its 2011 impact factor is 0.857.

History 
The journal was established in 1988 with founding editor-in-chief Victor Raskin. The full list of editors-in-chief is:
 Victor Raskin (1988-1999)
 Lawrence E. Mintz (2000-2002)
 Salvatore Attardo (2003-2012)
 Giselinde Kuipers (2012-2015)
 Thomas E. Ford (2016-2020)
 Christian F. Hempelmann (2021-present)

References

External links 
 
 International Society for Humor Studies
 Journal page on Society's website

Humor research
Differential psychology journals
Quarterly journals
English-language journals
De Gruyter academic journals
Publications established in 1988